

List of announcers by letter

A
Marv Albert In , Albert, who had called backup play-by-play for NBC baseball earlier in the decade, became the network's pregame host for the series Major League Baseball: An Inside Look. Herzog retorted by saying "I don't think that's funny, Marv!"
Mel Allen (1951–1953; 1955–1958; 1960–1963)
Sparky Anderson (1979 American League Championship Series)

B
 Jason Benetti (2022)
Sal Bando (1982)
Red Barber (1948 World Series and 1952 World Series)
Johnny Bench (1994)
Len Berman
Buddy Blattner (1964; 1969)
Marty Brennaman (1975 World Series and 1976 World Series)
Jack Brickhouse (1954 World Series, 1959 World Series, and 1951–1953 All-Star Games)
Jim Britt
Jack Buck (1965 All-Star Game and Game of the Week announcer in 1976)

C
Harry Caray (1964 World Series, 1967 World Series, and 1968 World Series)
Skip Caray (called all Division Series games in 2000 while Bob Costas was concluding his Olympic hosting duties from Sydney, Australia)
Ken Coleman (1967 World Series)
Bob Costas (1982–1989, 1994–2000)

D
Byron Day
Bucky Dent
Don Drysdale (1977)
Leo Durocher (1957–1959)

E
Gene Elston (1968 All-Star Game)
Dick Enberg (1977–1982)
Bill Enis (1972–1973)

G
Joe Garagiola (1961–1964; 1974–1988)
Gayle Gardner (1989) In , Gardner became the first female to regularly host Major League Baseball coverage for a television network.
Bob Gibson
Curt Gowdy (1958 World Series, 1st 1959 All-Star Game, 1st 1960 All-Star Game, 2nd 1961 All-Star Game, 2nd 1962 All-Star Game, and 1964 World Series; 1966–1975)
Jim Gray (1995–2000)
Bryant Gumbel (1976–1981)
Greg Gumbel (1994–1995)

H
Fred Haney (1960)
Merle Harmon (1980–1981)
Ken Harrelson (1984–1987)
Al Helfer (1955–1958 All-Star Games and 1957 World Series)
Russ Hodges (1951 World Series, 1954 World Series, and 1962 World Series, 2nd 1959 All-Star Game, and 1st 1961 All-Star Game)
Tom Hussey

J
Charlie Jones (1977–1979)

K
Jim Kaat (1984–1986)
George Kell (1962 National League playoff, 2nd 1962 All-Star Game, and 1968 World Series)
Gene Kelly
Sandy Koufax (1967–1972) In 1971, Koufax signed a ten-year contract with NBC for $1 million to be a broadcaster on the Saturday Game of the Week. Koufax never felt comfortable being in front of the camera; he quit before the  season.
Tony Kubek (1965–1989)

L
Barry Larkin (1999 World Series)
John Lowenstein
Ron Luciano (1980–1981)

M
Bill Macatee (1982–1989) Macatee joined NBC in 1982, where he hosted and reported on a variety of major events including late-night coverage of Wimbledon and the World Series, as well as the pre-game shows for the League Championship Series, Super Bowl XVII, and college football bowl games.
Mickey Mantle (1969–1970)
Ned Martin (1975 World Series)
Tim McCarver (1980) 
Jim McIntyre (1970 World Series)
Al Michaels (1972 World Series)
Jon Miller (1986–1989) Miller would call games for NBC on their occasional doubleheader weeks. If not that, then Miller would appear on Saturday afternoon regionals the day after NBC's occasional prime time telecasts.
Joe Morgan (1986–1987, 1994–2000)
Monte Moore (1972 World Series, 1973 World Series, 1974 World Series, and Game of the Week announcer from 1978–1980; 1983)

N
Lindsey Nelson (1957–1961; 1964, 1971 All-Star Game, 1969 World Series, and 1973 World Series) When NBC got baseball with Lindsey Nelson and Leo Durocher, for a while, the backup team was Chuck Thompson and Bill Veeck.

O
Bill O'Donnell (1969–1976)
Keith Olbermann (1997–1998)

P
Wes Parker (1979 American League Championship Series and Game of the Week announcer from 1978-1979)
Freddie Patek (1982-1983)
Van Patrick (1948 World Series)
Bob Prince (1960 World Series and 1971 World Series)
Mel Proctor (1989)

R
Jay Randolph (1982–1989)
Pee Wee Reese (1966–1968)
Phil Rizzuto (1964 World Series and 1976 World Series)
Jimmy Roberts (2000)
Ted Robinson (1986–1989)
Al Rosen (1959–1960)

S
Craig Sager (1999 National League Championship Series and 1999 World Series)
Ray Scott (1960; 1965 World Series)
Vin Scully (2nd 1959 All-Star Game, 2nd 1962 All-Star Game, 1963 All-Star Game, 1953 World Series, 1955–1956 World Series, 1963 World Series, 1965–1966 World Series, and 1974 World Series; 1983–1989)
Tom Seaver (postseason telecasts only from 1978–1984 and Game of the Week announcer in 1989)
Mike Shannon
Jim Simpson (1966–1977; 1979)
Duke Snider (1983 National League Championship Series)
Bob Stanton
Dick Stockton (1975 World Series)
Phil Stone (1982–1985)
Hannah Storm (1994–2000)
Don Sutton (1979 National League Championship Series, 1983 All-Star Game, and pre and post-game analyst for NBC's coverage of the 1987 League Championship Series)

T
Chuck Thompson (1958–1960; 1966 World Series, 1970 World Series, and 1971 World Series)
Joe Torre (1988–1989)

U
Bob Uecker (1994–1997)

V
Bill Veeck (1958)

W
Dick Williams (1974)
Maury Wills (1973–1977)
Bob Wischusen (2000 American League Division Series)
Bob Wolff (1962–1965)
Jim Woods (1957)

See also
List of current Major League Baseball announcers

References

External links
Searchable Network TV Broadcasts

NBC
Broadcasters